Odostomia lubrica is a species of sea snail, a marine gastropod mollusc in the family Pyramidellidae, the pyrams and their allies.

Description
The shell grows to a length of 2.2 mm.

Distribution
This species occurs in the Atlantic Ocean off the Bermudas.

References

External links
 To Biodiversity Heritage Library (3 publications)
 To Encyclopedia of Life
 To World Register of Marine Species

lubrica
Gastropods described in 1900